Manolito "Eric" Gonzales Jr. (born September 3, 1972) is a Filipino professional basketball coach, currently with the Quezon Huskers in the Maharlika Pilipinas Basketball League (MPBL) as a head coach.

Coaching career

Gonzales is a former University of Santo Tomas track and field star from 1992 to 1994. He started his coaching career by serving as an assistant for Binky Favis in 1995 with the Tiger Cubs. There, he slowly built his résumé while coaching in the minor leagues for the St. Stephen High School with his brother Warren Gonzales, and would later spend time on the Purefoods and Coca-Cola benches. At GlobalPort, he served as an assistant to coaches Junel Baculi and Ritchie Ticzon. He was the longtime deputy coach to Nash Racela at Far Eastern University.

Prior to the 2014–15 PBA season, he was again called up to the Batang Pier bench by no less than team owner Mikee Romero, and acted as the lead assistant for coach Pido Jarencio.  Nine games into the season, he was given the head coaching job on an interim basis after Romero decided to relieve Jarencio from his coaching duties.

In his head coaching debut, he won the game in a blowout fashion for GlobalPort against Barangay Ginebra on November 30, 2014.

On March 31, 2015, Gonzales was relegated as the team's assistant coach, while reappointing team consultant Pido Jarencio as the head coach.

In May 2016, GlobalPort reappointed Gonzales as their head coach, replacing Jarencio, following the appointment of Franz Pumaren as the team consultant.

On September 2, 2018, TNT named Gonzales as interim head coach after previous coach Nash Racela went on indefinite leave after a poor 1–4 start to the 2018 Governors' Cup.

References

1972 births
Living people
Filipino men's basketball coaches
UST Growling Tigers basketball players

Basketball players from Manila
NU Bulldogs basketball coaches
NorthPort Batang Pier coaches
FEU Tamaraws basketball coaches
TNT Tropang Giga coaches